Baarishein is a 2019 romantic and ballad Hindi song, written and composed by Arko Pravo Mukherjee and sung by Pakistani singer Atif Aslam. The music video of the track features Atif and Nushrat Bharucha. The song has also the use of Piano and Violin.

Release 
The music video was released on 14 February 2019 by T-Series on YouTube. The single received more than a million views within 5 hours of its release on YouTube. It has received 36 million views on YouTube as of August 2020.

Nushat Bharucha said before the release on song.

Music video 
The song is about heartbreak pain. According to Mid-Day report, this song is produced by T-Series. Atif has to endure the pain of a relationship that is no longer happy. Atif and Nushrat together, remember the happy times of their love and show how this relationship breaks down.

The music video of the song was shot in Los Angeles by Davide Zennie. This was first single music video of Nushrat Bharucha.

Video credits 
 Starring – Atif Aslam and Nushrat Bharucha
 Director – David Zennie
 Location – Los Angeles

Problems with release 
Atif revealed this song a day before Pulwama attack. But after the attack, the MNS asked all music companies to stop working with Pakistani artist. As a result, T-Series removed the songs from YouTube. But now, it has brought all songs back as they lost over a million subscribers.

Credits 
 Programming and Arrangement – Aditya Dev
 Guitars – Krishna Pradhan
 Guitars recorded by Rahul Sharma at AMV studios
 Harpejji – Aditya Dev
 Mix and Master – Aditya Dev

References 

Hindi songs
Atif Aslam songs
Indian songs
2018 songs
Songs written by Arko Pravo Mukherjee
T-Series (company) singles